Gentzel is a Swedish surname. Notable people with the surname include:
Heiko Gentzel (born Erfurt in 1960), German politician
Inga Gentzel (1908–1991), Swedish runner
Ludde Gentzel (1885–1963), Swedish film actor, uncle of Inga
Peter Gentzel (born 1968), Swedish handball player 

Swedish-language surnames